Julica is a monotypic genus of gastropods belonging to the family Clausiliidae. The only species is  Julica schmidtii.

The species is found near Alps.

References

Clausiliidae